In finance, rate risk is the risk of losses caused by interest rate changes. The prices of most financial instruments, such as stocks and bonds move inversely with interest rates, so investors are subject to capital loss when rates rise.

In the investment world, there are two types of risk rating.  One is to manifest company's credit and another to equity securities.  The former is represented by the systems of Fitch Ratings, Moody's and Standard & Poor's whereas the later by that of Comisión Clasificadora de Riesgo, although the two types have some similarities to some extent.

Financial economics
Market risk
Interest rates

ru:Риск процентной ставки